The naked-faced spiderhunter (Arachnothera clarae) is a species of bird in the family Nectariniidae.
It is endemic to the Philippines.

Its natural habitat is subtropical or tropical moist lowland forests.

Gallery

References

naked-faced spiderhunter
Endemic birds of the Philippines
naked-faced spiderhunter
Taxa named by August Wilhelm Heinrich Blasius
Taxonomy articles created by Polbot